Leopold Gernhardt (16 March 1920 – 18 April 2013) was an Austrian footballer and coach. He was also part of Austria's squad for the football tournament at the 1948 Summer Olympics, but he did not play in any matches.

References

External links
 Rapid Archiv
 Sturm Archiv

1920 births
2013 deaths
Austrian footballers
Austria international footballers
Association football midfielders
Austrian football managers
SK Rapid Wien players
SK Rapid Wien managers
First Vienna FC managers